Z  is a Canadian French language specialty channel owned by Bell Media. Z focuses on programming primarily from the science fiction, fantasy, and technology genres consisting of dramas, films, and documentaries.

History
In May 1999, Radiomutuel Inc. was granted approval by the Canadian Radio-television and Telecommunications Commission (CRTC) for a television broadcasting licence for a channel called Canal Z, aux limites du savoir, described as "a national French-language television specialty service that is dedicated entirely to science and technology, the earth and its secrets, space exploration, the paranormal and science fiction, lifestyles and computer science."

Before the channel was launched, in June 1999, Astral Media announced its intention to purchase Radiomutuel, which was approved by the CRTC on January 12, 2000 and closed shortly thereafter.

The channel launched on January 31, 2000 as Canal Z (often referred to as simply Z). The channel was renamed Ztélé in 2005 and a new logo was introduced. In 2006, an HD feed debuted.

Astral Media was acquired by Bell Media on July 5, 2013, making Ztélé a sister channel to the English-language science-fiction channel Space, while retaining its other sister stations. Disney Junior was sold to DHX Media, and MusiMax and MusiquePlus were sold to V Media Group, both deals occurring the next year.

As of August 25, 2014, the channel has been renamed Z.

Z HD
On October 30, 2006, Astral Media launched "Z HD" (then-known as "Ztélé HD"), a HD simulcast of Z's standard definition feed.

References

External links 
  

Bell Media networks
Analog cable television networks in Canada
Television channels and stations established in 2000
French-language television networks in Canada
2000 establishments in Canada